Francesco Squillace (6 November 1925 – 6 June 2020) was an Italian lawyer, politician, and a member of the Christian Democracy party. Squillace served as the President of the Province of Catanzaro, in Calabria, for a brief tenure in 1975. He also served as the Mayor of Chiaravalle Centrale for two terms in the 1950s and 1960s, as well as a member of the Provincial Council of Catanzaro. Additionally, he was the former Catanzaro provincial secretary of the Christian Democrats (DC).

Squillace died on 6 June 2020 at the age of 94.

References

1925 births
2020 deaths
Presidents of the Province of Catanzaro
Mayors of places in Calabria
Christian Democracy (Italy) politicians
20th-century Italian lawyers